Tirupati Ganga Jatara is the annual folk festival of Tirupati, India. It is a week long event which falls between first and second weeks of May every year. This festival is to offer prayers to the goddess Gangamma, the Gramadevata (the goddess looking after the village) of Tirupati.

Legend
Sri Tataiahgunta Gangamma is Grama Devatha of Tirupati city. Once upon a time when Tirupati and surrounding areas were ruled by Palegondulu, harassment on women was enormous – they use to rape and harass any woman seen. During this time, in a village "Avilala", the Goddess Gangamma was born and grew into a most beautiful women. When the Palegondulu wanted to harm Goddess Gangamma, she with her grace and power tried to kill him. Palegondulu, fearing her, hid in a remote place. 

To take him out of hiding, the Gangamma planned "Ganga Jathara" where the people in Tirupathi do vichitra veshadarana and curse Gangamma for a period of 7 days. On the seventh day, the Palegondulu comes out of hiding and was killed by Goddess Gangamma for the LokaKalyanam (well being of all people).

About
Ganga Jatara, the folk festival of Tirupati, begins with the formal Chatimpu (announcement) around midnight of Tuesday. The Gangamma Jatara is held by the Theallaya Mirasi Achari family – Eepur Achari and Kasi Achari take charge of Jatara festival and make all arrangements.

The Gangamma Jatara is a very famous local festival for the people of Tirupati. It is done every year in May. As the Gangamma temple was in the banks of Thathaya gunta, the temple is famously known as "Tataiahgunta Gangamma Temple".

Priests performed the initiatory rituals and tied `Vadibalu' to the `Viswaroopa Sthambam' in front of the temple, that set the stage for the fete. Men making the Chatimpu roam through the old town beating  to announce that the festival has begun and hence the residents should not leave the town till the festival is over.

Priests make the traditional huge clay idol of the goddess at the temple's portico. Everyone during the festival comes and prays to the goddess to offer her pongal, sarees, turmeric and kumkum, etc.

During the last day of festival, the portico will be smashed it into pieces at the auspicious moment. Devotees then clamour around to get the clay smithereens, which they consider as sacred, to be either preserved in the ‘Puja' room or consumed by mixing it in water. Though there is a ban on animal sacrifice, goats and fowls were chopped at will at a corner of the temple.

This festival is being celebrated on 13, 14 and 15 May every year, in most of the areas in Tirupati district and chittoor district (like Tirupati, Chittoor and Palamaner  etc.), Andhra Pradesh, India.

The Festival

Day 0: Chatimpu
The Jatara (Folk Festival) officially begins with Chatimpu (official announcement) during midnight of 2nd Tuesday of the month of May. Traditionally town folk stay away from streets during Chatimpu. This announcement is carried by playing musical instruments known as Dappu.

Day 1: Bhairagi Vesham
The day after chatimpu is Bhairagi Vesham. On this day, (Wednesday) people used to smear their body with white color paste (Namam Kommu) and wear a garland made of "Rella kaya" (fruit). They will hold neem leaves with the hand and also tie their waist with neem leaves. Devotees will walk to the temple through the city and will leave those neem leaves and Rella Kaya graland there at the temple after the darshan of the Goddess. Devotees will do such procession on each day for the rest of the festival duration.

Day 2: Banda Vesham
On this day devotees used to smear their body with kumkum color paste and ties a ribbon to the head.

Day 3: Thoti Vesham
On this day devotees used to smear their body with charcoal and wears a garland made out of neem leaves.

Day 4: Sunnapu Gandalu
On the sixth day of the festival, devotees smear their body with white color paste and applies dots with charcoal. And carries a pot (Veyyi kalla Dutta) on their head.

Day 5: Dora Vesham
On this day devotees used to smear their body with sandal paste (Chandanam) and wears a garland made out of neem leaves and lemons.

Day 6: Mathangi Vesham
Gangamma who killed Palegadu in Dhora Vesham, consoled Chieftain's wife in Mathangi Vesham.

Day 7: Gangamma Jatara
The last day of the festival is celebrated as Ganga Jatara. During this day, all Gangamma temples in Tirupati are flocked with lakhs of devotees. People used to visit temple and offer "pongallu" and/or Sarees to Gangamma. Few Devotees used to have darshan of Gangamma by wearing "Sapparalu" (A special gopuram like object made of bamboo) along with "Dappu Vaidyam" (A musical instrument). "Ragi Ambali" is served to the devotees visiting temples all over the city.

After the midnight, a clay idol of Gangamma (Viswaroopam) is installed in front of the Temple. A guy will dress up like "Perantallu" and will remove the chempa (cheek) of viswaroopam which is referred to as "Chempa Tholagimpu". The clay is later distributed to the Devotees which is believed to have curing powers. By this event the entire seven-day Jatara will come to an end.

Offerings

Animals
Devotees offer the goddess goats and hens.

Pongal
Women prepare pongal (dish prepared with rice, mung beans and sugar) in the temple and offer to the goddess.

Walking on knees
Similarly, there is another practice for women to come on their knees from their home to the temple. First, they roll a coconut on the road and then walk on their knees up to the point, pick up the coconut and roll it again. These practices bear testimony to the strong faith the native residents of Tirupati have in the goddess.

Drinks
‘Ragi Ambali', a drink made of ragi, curd and rice, is offered to the goddess and is then distributed to the devotees.

See also
Hindu Temples in Tirupati
Tirupati
Gangamma Jatara

References

Festivals in Andhra Pradesh
Tirupati